The following outline is provided as an overview of and topical guide to Uttar Pradesh:

Uttar Pradesh – most populous state in the Republic of India as well as the most populous country subdivision in the world. It was created on 1 April 1937 as the United Provinces during British rule, and was renamed Uttar Pradesh in 1950. Lucknow is the capital city of Uttar Pradesh. Ghaziabad, Meerut, Muzaffarnagar, Kanpur, Gorakhpur, Allahabad, Raebareli, Moradabad, Bareilly, Aligarh, Sonbhadra, and Varanasi are known for their industrial importance in the state. On 9 November 2000, a new state, Uttarakhand, was carved out from the Himalayan hill region of Uttar Pradesh. The state in the northern region of the Indian subcontinent has over 200 million inhabitants.

General reference

Names 
 Common English name: Uttar Pradesh
 Pronunciation: , 
 Official English name(s): State of Uttar Pradesh

Abbreviation: U.P.
UN/LOCODE: IN-UP 
 Nickname(s): Scotland of East (unofficial)

 Adjectival(s): Uttar Pradeshi
 Demonym(s): Uttar Pradeshis

Rankings (amongst India's states) 

 by population: 1st
 by area (2011 census): 4th
 by crime rate (2015): 27th
 by gross domestic product (GDP) (2014): 3rd
by Human Development Index (HDI): 10th
by life expectancy at birth: 20th
by literacy rate: 29th

Geography of Uttar Pradesh 

Geography of Uttar Pradesh
 Uttar Pradesh is: an Indian state
 Population of Uttar Pradesh: 199,812,341 (2011) 
Area of Uttar Pradesh: 243,290 km2(93,930 sq mi) 
 Atlas of Uttar Pradesh

Location of Uttar Pradesh 
 Uttar Pradesh is situated within the following regions:
 Northern Hemisphere
 Eastern Hemisphere
 Eurasia
 Asia
 South Asia
 Indian subcontinent
 India
 North India
 Time zone:  Indian Standard Time (UTC+05:30)

Environment of Uttar Pradesh 

 Climate of Uttar Pradesh

Places in Uttar Pradesh

Places in Uttar Pradesh

List of historic places in Uttar Pradesh

List of bridges in Uttar Pradesh

List of parks in Uttar Pradesh

List of museums in Uttar Pradesh

Environment of Uttar Pradesh 
Environment of Uttar Pradesh

Climate of Uttar Pradesh

Natural History of Uttar Pradesh

Forests in Uttar Pradesh

Flora of Uttar Pradesh

Fauna of Uttar Pradesh

Mammals in Uttar Pradesh

Birds of Uttar Pradesh

Geographical features of Uttar Pradesh 
Lakes of Uttar Pradesh

Rivers of Uttar Pradesh

Mountains of Uttar Pradesh

Regions of Uttar Pradesh

Administrative divisions of Uttar Pradesh 

Administrative divisions of Uttar Pradesh

List of districts of Uttar Pradesh

Districts of Uttar Pradesh

Municipalities of Uttar Pradesh 

Municipalities of Uttar Pradesh

 Capital of Uttar Pradesh: Lucknow
 Cities of Uttar Pradesh

Demography of Uttar Pradesh 

Demographics of Uttar Pradesh

Government and politics of Uttar Pradesh 

Politics of Uttar Pradesh

 Form of government: Indian state government (parliamentary system of representative democracy)
Uttar Pradesh State Capitol
Capital of Uttar Pradesh: Lucknow
Political Party strength in Uttar Pradesh
 Elections in Uttar Pradesh
 (specific elections)

Union government in Uttar Pradesh 
 Rajya Sabha members from Uttar Pradesh
 Uttar Pradesh Pradesh Congress Committee
 Indian general election, 2009 (Uttar Pradesh)
 Indian general election, 2014 (Uttar Pradesh)

Branches of the government of Uttar Pradesh 

Government of Uttar Pradesh

Executive branch of the government of Uttar Pradesh 

 Head of state: Governor of Uttar Pradesh: Ram Naik (19th governor)
 Head of government: Chief Minister of Uttar Pradesh: Yogi Adityanath (21st chief minister) 
 Council of Ministers of Uttar Pradesh

Legislative branch of the government of Uttar Pradesh 

Uttar Pradesh Legislative Assembly
 Constituencies of Uttar Pradesh Legislative Assembly

Judicial branch of the government of Uttar Pradesh 
Allahabad High Court

Courts in Uttar Pradesh

Law and order in Uttar Pradesh 

 
Law of Uttar Pradesh
Constitution of India
Capital Punishment in Uttar Pradesh
List of people executed in Uttar Pradesh
Crime in Uttar Pradesh
List of prisons in Uttar Pradesh
Law enforcement in Uttar Pradesh
Uttar Pradesh Police

History of Uttar Pradesh 

History of Uttar Pradesh

History of Uttar Pradesh, by topics 
MPL winner

World asia record holder

Rajesh prasad Sah, MPL grand League winner of 2020 he won 7.70crore Dharikshan Mishr, Bhojpuri language poet Sachchidananda Vatsyayan 'Agyeya', noted Hindi writer.

Indian Rebellion of 1857
Prehistory of Uttar Pradesh

Uttar Pradesh under British Rule

Uttar Pradesh under Mughal rule

United Provinces

United Provinces of Agra and Oudh

Creation of Uttrakhand

British Raj

Mughal Empire

Dominion of India

Timeline of Uttar Pradesh

Rani of Jhansi

Medieval Uttar Pradesh

Ancient Uttar Pradesh

Modern Uttar Pradesh (1956- present)

History of Uttar Pradesh, by region 
History of Allahabad

History of Lucknow

History of Kanpur

History of Aligarh, Uttar Pradesh

History of Jhansi

History of Agra

History of Varanasi

History of Noida

History of Ayodhya

History of Gorakhpur

History of Muzaffarnagar

History of Meerut

History of Bareilly

History of Uttar Pradesh, by subject 
History of education in Uttar Pradesh

History of Uttar Pradesh police

History of Islam in Uttar Pradesh

History of Hinduism in Uttar Pradesh

History of Christianity in Uttar Pradesh

History of Buddhism in Uttar Pradesh

History of sports in Uttar Pradesh

Culture of Uttar Pradesh 

Culture of Uttar Pradesh
 Architecture of Uttar Pradesh
 
 Languages of Uttar Pradesh
Museums in Uttar Pradesh
Religion in Uttar Pradesh
Cuisine of Uttar Pradesh
 Monuments in Uttar Pradesh
 Monuments of National Importance in Uttar Pradesh
 State Protected Monuments in Uttar Pradesh
 Public holidays in Uttar Pradesh
 Records of Uttar Pradesh
 World Heritage Sites in Uttar Pradesh

Art in Uttar Pradesh 

 Music of Uttar Pradesh

People of Uttar Pradesh 

 People from Uttar Pradesh

Religion in Uttar Pradesh 

Religion in Uttar Pradesh
 Christianity in Uttar Pradesh
 Hinduism in Uttar Pradesh
 Islam in Uttar Pradesh
Buddhism in Uttar Pradesh
Jainism in Uttar Pradesh
Sikhism in Uttar Pradesh

Sports in Uttar Pradesh 
Sports in Uttar Pradesh

 Cricket in Uttar Pradesh
 Uttar Pradesh Cricket Association
 Uttar Pradesh cricket team
 Football in Uttar Pradesh
 Uttar Pradesh football team

Symbols of Uttar Pradesh 

Symbols of Uttar Pradesh
 State animal: Barasingha
 State bird: Sarus crane
 State flower: Palash
 State seal: Emblem of Uttar Pradesh
 State tree: Ashoka tree
Nickname(s): Scotland of the East       (unofficial)

Economy and infrastructure of Uttar Pradesh 

 Tourism in Uttar Pradesh
Communication in Uttar Pradesh
Newspapers in Uttar Pradesh
Radio stations in Uttar Pradesh
Economy of Uttar Pradesh
Infrastructure of Uttar Pradesh

Transport in Uttar Pradesh
Airports in Uttar Pradesh
Roads in Uttar Pradesh

Education in Uttar Pradesh 

Education in Uttar Pradesh
 Institutions of higher education in Uttar Pradesh
List of schools in Uttar Pradesh

Health in Uttar Pradesh 

Health in Uttar Pradesh

Hospitals in Uttar Pradesh

See also 

Outline of India
Uttar Pradesh
Uttar Pradesh Legislative Assembly
Uttar Pradesh Police
Uttar Pradesh Power Corporation Limited
Government of Uttar Pradesh

References

External links 

 Uttar Pradesh Government Website
 Department of Tourism, Government of Uttar Pradesh
 
 Uttar Pradesh Districts
 Uttar Pradesh Districts Map
 Pincodes of Uttar Pradesh
 News About Uttar Pradesh 

Uttar Pradesh
Uttar Pradesh
 1